Graduados is a 2012 Argentine TV series.

The Goddzer

The Falsini/Catáneo

Others

Minor characters

Playing themselves
 Gastón Gaudio
 Pablo Ruiz
 Sébastien Loeb
 Pimpinela
 Silvio Soldán
 César "Banana" Pueyrredón
 Rosario Ortega
 Cayetano
 Fabiana Cantilo
 Martín Palermo
 Guillermo Coppola
 Sandra Mihanovich
 Charly García
 Emanuel Ortega
 Brenda Bonotto
 Mario "Pájaro" Gómez
 Florencia de la V
 Fito Páez
 Pipo Cipolatti
 El Bahiano
 Los Pericos
 Viviana Canosa
 Bobby Flores
 Juanse
 Axel
 Palito Ortega
 Enanitos Verdes
 Claudio María Domínguez

External links
 Official site - Personajes 
 TV Tropes - Characters 

Lists of Argentine television series characters
Lists of comedy television characters
Fictional Argentine people
Argentina culture-related lists